Soba ( or , "buckwheat") is a thin Japanese noodle made from buckwheat. The noodles are served either chilled with a dipping sauce, or hot in a noodle soup. The variety Nagano soba includes wheat flour.

In Japan, soba noodles can be found in a variety of settings, from "fast food" venues to expensive specialty restaurants. Markets sell dried noodles and men-tsuyu, or instant noodle broth, to make home preparation easy. A wide variety of dishes, both hot for winter and cold for summer, uses these noodles.

The amino acid balance of the protein in buckwheat, and therefore in soba, is well matched to the needs of humans and can complement the amino acid deficiencies of other staples such as rice and wheat (see protein combining). The tradition of eating soba arose in the Edo period.

History of soba in Japan, development of eateries

The tradition of eating soba originates from the Tokugawa period, also called the Edo period, from 1603 to 1868. In this period, every neighborhood had one or two soba establishments, many also serving sake, which functioned much like modern cafes where locals would stop for a casual meal. At that time, the population of Edo (Tokyo), being considerably wealthier than the rural poor, were more susceptible to beriberi due to their high consumption of white rice, which is low in thiamine. It was discovered that beriberi could be prevented by regularly eating thiamine-rich soba.

The delivery of food called demae was originally a service for wealthy daimyō in the 1700s. Until the late Showa period, piles of soba bowls were packed on the shoulders of bicycle couriers. In March 1961, new cycling traffic laws added restrictions. Officials of the Tokyo Metropolitan Police Department said "To ride on a bicycle with piles of 'soba' bowls on your shoulder is dangerous. It must be prohibited from the viewpoint of road traffic safety. But we will not place any stricter curb as they will lose more than half their customers" and "With this police assurance to overlook the illegal traffic practice, 'soba' delivery boys will continue to race through the streets of Tokyo,". This method of soba delivery is not practiced anymore.

Some establishments, especially cheaper and more casual ones, may serve both soba and udon as they are often served in a similar manner. Soba is the traditional noodle of choice for Tokyoites.

Serving soba

Soba is typically eaten with chopsticks, and in Japan, it is considered acceptable to slurp the noodles noisily. This is especially common with hot noodles, as drawing up the noodles quickly into the mouth helps cool them. However, quiet consumption of noodles is no longer uncommon.

Common soba dishes
Like many Japanese noodles, soba noodles are often served drained and chilled in the summer, and hot in the winter with a soy-based dashi broth. Extra toppings can be added to both hot and cold soba. Toppings are chosen to reflect the seasons and to balance with other ingredients. Most toppings are added without much cooking, although some are deep-fried. Most of these dishes may also be prepared with udon.

Cold soba dishes

Chilled soba is often served on a sieve-like bamboo tray called a zaru, sometimes garnished with bits of dried nori seaweed, with a dipping sauce known as soba tsuyu on the side. The tsuyu is made of a strong mixture of dashi, sweetened soy sauce (also called "satōjōyu") and mirin. Using chopsticks, the diner picks up a small amount of soba from the tray and dips it in the cold tsuyu before eating it. Wasabi and scallions are often mixed into the tsuyu. Many people think that the best way to experience the unique texture of hand-made soba noodles is to eat them cold, since letting them soak in hot broth changes their consistency. After the noodles are eaten, many people enjoy drinking the water in which the noodles were cooked (sobayu ), mixed with the leftover tsuyu.

Hadaka soba (naked soba 裸蕎麦): Cold soba served on its own.
Hiyashi soba: Cold soba served with various toppings sprinkled on top, after which the broth is poured on by the diner. It may include:
tororo: puree of yamaimo (a Japanese yam with a mucilaginous texture)
oroshi: grated daikon radish
nattō: sticky fermented soybeans
okura: fresh sliced okra
Mori soba: Basic chilled soba noodles served on a flat basket or a plate.
Soba maki: A makizushi prepared as cold soba wrapped in nori.
 Soba salad: Cold soba mixed in the sesame dressing with vegetables. It is more of a modern and fusion cold soba dish served outside Japan.
Zaru soba: Mori soba topped with shredded nori seaweed.

Hot soba dishes

Soba is also often served as a noodle soup in a bowl of hot tsuyu. The hot tsuyu in this instance is thinner than that used as a dipping sauce for chilled soba. Popular garnishes are sliced long onion and shichimi tōgarashi (mixed chili powder).

Curry nanban : Karē nanban
 : Tanuki soba
Kake soba : Hot soba in broth topped with thinly sliced scallion, and perhaps a slice of kamaboko (fish cake).
: Topped with duck meat and negi.
 (in Kantō) or  Tanuki soba ("raccoon dog soba", in Kansai): Topped with aburaage (deep-fried tofu).
: Hot soba (or udon) noodles in curry flavored broth topped with chicken/pork and thinly sliced scallion.
Nameko soba : Topped with nameko mushroom
Nishin soba : Topped with cooked 
Sansai soba  ("mountain vegetables soba"): Topped with sansai, or wild vegetables such as warabi, zenmai and takenoko (bamboo shoots).
Sobagaki : A chunk of dough made of buckwheat flour and hot water.
 (in Kantō) or Haikara soba  (in Kansai): Topped with tenkasu (bits of deep-fried tempura batter).
Tempura soba : Topped with tempura, a large shrimp frequently is used, but vegetables are also popular. Some of soba venders use kakiage for this dish and this often is called Tensoba.
Tororo soba  or Yamakake soba : Topped with tororo, the puree of yamaimo (a Japanese yam with a mucilaginous texture).
Tsukimi soba  ("moon-viewing soba"): Topped with raw egg, which poaches in the hot soup.
Wakame soba : Topped with wakame seaweed
Yamakake soba : Tororo soba

Soba served on special occasions
Soba is traditionally eaten on New Year's Eve in most areas of Japan, a tradition that survives to this day (Toshikoshi soba). In the Tokyo area, there is also a tradition of giving out soba to new neighbors after a house move (Hikkoshi soba), although this practice is now rare.

Nutritional value of soba
100 grams of cooked soba yields  of energy. Soba contains all nine essential amino acids, including lysine, which common wheat does not contain.

Soba contains a type of polysaccharide that is easily digested. Soba noodles also contain antioxidants, including rutin and quercetin, and essential nutrients including choline, thiamine and riboflavin.

Varieties of soba noodles and types of soba in Japan

Buckwheat is ready for harvest in three months, allowing four crops a year, mainly in spring, summer, and autumn. In Japan, buckwheat is produced mainly in Hokkaido. Soba that is made with newly harvested buckwheat is called shin-soba. It is sweeter and more flavorful than regular soba.

Nagano Prefecture is famous for soba.  The noodles are known as shinshu soba.  One of the reasons for this popularity is that Nagano has natural features well-suited to soba production. The land has plenty of volcanic ash soil because of its highland location.  It also has an extreme difference in temperatures. Many famous soba production centers can be found across the prefecture, from the Kurohime and Togakushi highlands in the north to the Kaida highlands in the south, and the prefecture boasts the second-highest production of soba in Japan. Many facilities are also engaged in integrated soba manufacturing, from cultivation to milling and cutting. Many of these facilities provide soba cutting courses for customers, forming one of the major leisure activities of Nagano.
Soba noodles are produced by mixing buckwheat flour with some wheat flour (to reduce brittleness), adding water, mixing, kneading, rolling and cutting. As a general rule, only noodles containing 40% or more soba flour can carry the shinshu name.

By location
Etanbetsu soba: named after the central region of Hokkaidō (Asahikawacity)
Izumo soba: named after Izumo in Shimane
Izushi soba: named after Izushi in Hyōgo
Shinshu soba: named after the old name of Nagano Prefecture. Also known as Shinano soba. (Shinano=Shinshu).

By ingredients
Cha soba: flavored with green tea powder
Hegi soba: flavored with funori seaweed
Inaka soba: "country soba", thick soba made with whole buckwheat
Jinenjo soba: flavored with wild yam flour
Ni-hachi soba: soba containing 20% wheat and 80% buckwheat
Sarashina soba: thin, light-colored soba, made with refined buckwheat
Towari soba or Juwari soba: 100% buckwheat soba.
Yomogi soba: flavored with mugwort

Soba restaurants

Sunaba, Chōjyu-an, Ōmura-an, Shōgetsu-an, Masuda-ya, Maruka are typical soba restaurants Yagō in Japan (Kantō region), from old time.

Some restaurants have delivery service by scooters (Honda Super Cub) or bicycles.

Moreover, they are a popular inexpensive fast food at railway stations. Mainly, busy salarymen use the service.

Other uses of the word soba

Soba is also the Japanese word for buckwheat (Fagopyrum esculentum). Roasted buckwheat kernels may be made into a grain tea called sobacha, which may be served hot or cold. Buckwheat hulls, or sobakawa (also called sobagara), are used to fill pillows. Sometimes, beers are made with roasted buckwheat added as a flavoring, and called "soba ale".

Soba is occasionally used to refer to noodles in general. In Japan, ramen is traditionally called chūka soba (中華そば) or, before the end of the Second World War, shina soba (支那そば). Both of these mean "Chinese noodles", though the word shina was replaced by chūka because the Chinese considered the former term offensive. Parboiled chūka soba is stir-fried to make yakisoba. The name ramen is the Japanese pronunciation of the Chinese lamian (拉麺). Mazesoba (also called abura soba or Taiwan mazesoba) is another ramen based dish. Note that these noodles do not contain buckwheat. In this context, 'soba' noodles proper are called nihon soba (日本蕎麦, 'Japanese soba') as opposed to chūka soba.

In Okinawa, soba usually refers to Okinawa soba, a completely different dish of noodles made out of flour, not buckwheat. Okinawa soba is also quite popular in the city of Campo Grande (Brazil), due to influence of Okinawan immigrants. It is eaten all-year long at street markets or in special restaurants called "sobarias". , the recipe has deviated from Okinawa style to suit Brazilian local preferences.

See also
 Frozen noodles
 Japanese cuisine
 List of buckwheat dishes
 List of noodles
 Ramen
 Toshikoshi soba
 Yakisoba

References

External links

 Tokyo soba chef making noodles by hand from scratch—illustrated article in English
 Soba restaurant owner in Nagano making soba noodles—slide show with English subtitles
Cook makes homemade soba noodles—video with English and Japanese subtitles

 
Articles containing video clips
Buckwheat dishes
Cold noodles
Noodle soups